Song of Triumphant Love is a 1915 short film directed by Yevgeni Bauer.

Plot 
The film is based on story by Ivan Turgenev.

Starring 

 Vera Kholodnaya
 Vitold Polonsky
 Ossip Runitsch

References

External links 
 

1915 films
1910s Russian-language films
Russian black-and-white films
Russian silent films
Films of the Russian Empire